Íñigo Cavero Lataillade, Marquis of el Castillo de Aysa, Baron of Carondelet, Baron of la Torre (1 August 1929 – 25 December 2002) was a Spanish aristocrat, lawyer and politician.

Biography and career
Born in San Sebastián on 1 August 1929, Cavero attended Our Lady of Remembrance College, Madrid before commencing studies in law and economics at the University of Deusto. Cavero completed his legal studies at the Complutense University of Madrid, where he later taught.

At that time, Cavero also ended his involvement with the Democratic Left. After joining the Union of the Democratic Centre, Cavero was elected to his first term on the Congress of Deputies as a representative from Madrid. He was reelected in 1979, as a deputy from Baleares. While serving consecutive terms as a member of the Congress of Deputies, Cavero also held several cabinet positions. He contested the congressional elections in 1982 in Grenada, but did not win. He remained the general secretary of the UDC until the party's dissolution in 1983. Cavero then assumed leadership roles in the People's Democratic Party and returned to the Congress of Deputies, winning election from Madrid in 1986. Cavero switched party affiliation to the Democratic and Social Centre in 1989 and ran for reelection in Burgos. He lost that year's election, and became a member of the People's Party in 1991. 

Cavero was named to the Spanish Council of State in 1996, and served until his death on 25 December 2002, of a heart attack at Clínica de La Luz in Madrid. He was 73.

References

1929 births
2002 deaths
Politicians from San Sebastián
20th-century Spanish lawyers
Members of the constituent Congress of Deputies (Spain)
Members of the 1st Congress of Deputies (Spain)
Members of the 3rd Congress of Deputies (Spain)
Education ministers of Spain
Justice ministers of Spain
Union of the Democratic Centre (Spain) politicians
Democratic and Social Centre (Spain) politicians
People's Party (Spain) politicians
University of Deusto alumni
Complutense University of Madrid alumni
Academic staff of the Complutense University of Madrid